The 2003 Wichita mayoral election took place on April 1, 2003, to elect the mayor of Wichita, Kansas. The election was held concurrently with various other local elections, and was officially nonpartisan. It saw the election of Carlos Mayans.

Results

Primary

General election

References

2003
2003 Kansas elections
2003 United States mayoral elections